The Myoma Amateur Music Association, commonly known as the Myoma troupe or Myoma band, is a traditional Burmese music band. Established in 1925 in Mandalay, it is the longest surviving band in the country.

History 
Myoma was established in 1925 by amateur musicians - Myoma Nyein, Gyi Ohn, Gyi Ngwe, Thant, Hla Din, and Mya Thein - in Mandalay, British Burma (now Myanmar). In 1928, a Chinese pawn shop owner donated money, enabling the band to expand its repertoire to a variety of wind instruments. The band's composer and leader, Myoma Nyein, became one of the country's most distinguished musicians. Throughout the years, the band briefly changed its name to others such as Naypyidaw, but ultimately reverted to its original name, Myoma.

From 1927 until 1978, Myoma was a fixture in Mandalay's Thingyan (traditional new year) celebrations, parading the city and performing live atop a parade float featuring a silver swan. The tradition was resumed in 1996. Over the years, notable actors and singers like Win Oo performed with Myoma. The band also entertained foreign delegations, including Zhou Enlai and Chen Yi, who visited Burma in the 1960s.

In the aftermath of the 2021 Myanmar coup d'état, the band courted controversy for performing at the opening ceremony of Yadanabon Hall in Mandalay, an event that headlined Min Aung Hlaing, the coup leader.The opening ceremony of Yadanabon Hall event was reportedly organized by executives who have close ties to the military regime. Most of those who performed were graduates of Mandalay University of Arts and Culture with only a few home-grown musicians of Myoma participating in the event. Following the performance, one of the main singers of the band, Aung Kyaw Hein, wrote on his Facebook that he had resigned from Myoma.

References

External links 

Mandalay
Musical groups established in the 1920s
Burmese musical groups